Rocafuerte Canton is a canton of Ecuador, located in the Manabí Province.  Its capital is the town of Rocafuerte.  Its population at the 2001 census was 29,321.

Demographics
Ethnic groups as of the Ecuadorian census of 2010:
Mestizo  64.7%
Montubio  29.4%
Afro-Ecuadorian  3.1%
White  2.6%
Indigenous  0.1%
Other  0.1%

References

Cantons of Manabí Province